Danganronpa Kirigiri (Japanese: ダンガンロンパ霧切) is a Japanese detective light novel series written by Takekuni Kitayama and illustrated by Rui Komatsuzaki. It was published by Seikaisha from September 13, 2013 to June 17, 2020, and has been collected in seven tankōbon volumes. A prequel to Danganronpa: Trigger Happy Havoc, the series focus on the future "Ultimate Detective" Kyoko Kirigiri over the course of several years as she rises through the ranks of the Detective Shelf Collection (DSC), solving various mysteries alongside her assistant, Yui Samidare.

Proposed by Danganronpa creator Kazutaka Kodaka, following a pitch from Kitayama, elements of the series were incorporated into Danganronpa 2: Goodbye Despair, Danganronpa Another Episode: Ultra Despair Girls, and Danganronpa 3: The End of Hope's Peak Academy. Receiving a universally positive critical reception, Spike Chunsoft ordered a spin-off video game of the series, also written and directed by Kitayama, and titled Kirigiri Sou, for release in October 2016. In November 2016, Danganronpa Kirigiri was nominated for the 2017 Sugoi Japan Award for "Best Entertainment Novel", ranking second behind Your Name.

Plot summary
Serving as a prequel to the events of Danganronpa: Trigger Happy Havoc and Danganronpa Zero, the story of Danganronpa Kirigiri takes place during the middle school years of Kyoko Kirigiri and her assistant Yui Samidare, as they explore the mystery of the Duel Noir cases, a legal succession of death games perpetrated by the über-rich.

In the second volume, the Robert Bloch novels Psycho and Psycho House are revealed to take place in the same world as Danganronpa, as Kyoko and Yui explore the renovated Bates Motel fifty years after the death of Norman Bates, investigating another Duel Noir.

Characters

 – The main character, an originally sixteen-year-old member of the Detective Shelf Collection (DSC) who becomes assistant to Kyoko Kirigiri, who is three years younger than her, writing of their experiences together in solving crimes. Having become a detective to find her sister's killer, Yui is killed in an explosion during the seventh volume.

 – The title character, the future "Ultimate Detective" whose family have been detectives for generations. Seeking to return the Kirigiri name to its former position after being abandoned by her father following her mother's death to be raised by her grandfather, Kyoko meets her assistant Yui at 13-years-old, after being involved together in a murder case, the series following the pair over the course of several years. In the seventh volume, Kyoko has the flesh burned off of her hands while trying to rescue Yui from the aftermath of an explosion.

In the second volume, Suisei is revealed to be gay.

 – An andrognynous Triple-Zero Detective of the Detective Library introduced in the third volume of the series, commonly nicknamed . Throughout the sixth and seventh volumes, Lico is heavily implied to be a younger , responsible for the "despair" graffiti seen on various signs throughout the series.

 – A rank-7 detective specializing in technological crime introduced in the third volume of the series.

 – Kyoko's paternal grandfather and adoptive parent, a master detective who trained his granddaughter in honing her detective skills.

 – Kyoko's maternal grandfather, a master of seven Japanese martial arts who taught his granddaughter in self-defense.

 – The Headmaster of Hope's Peak Academy and Kyoko's estranged father, who abandoned her as a child.

 – A tall European assassin dressed as Little Red Riding Hood who kills her targets by impersonating the M.O. of local serial killers in the corresponding country or state she is in, in particular Genocide Jack.

 – A short Romanian assassin in possession of a private jet, which he uses to flee after publicly killing his targets with a silenced pistol.

 – An assassin and former "Ultimate Rock Climber" of Hope's Peak Academy, capable of scaling walls with his bare hands and bending metal and bone, having previously illegally climbed Angkor Watt and the Eiffel Tower.

 – A hologram modelled after deceased serial killer Norman Bates, who serves as the host of the Duel Noir taking place at the renovated Bates Motel, now a tourist attraction.

 – The "Ultimate Lucky Student" of Hope's Peak Academy and classmate of Kyoko's, who becomes her future partner.

Volumes
The series has been collected into seven tankōbon volumes, the first of which was published in September 2013 and the last of which was published in June 2020.

Video game

In October 2016, a spin-off "sound" visual novel, entitled Kirigiri Sou, was quietly released by Spike Chunsoft. A stand-alone sequel to the events of Danganronpa Kirigiri, Takekuni Kitayama revealed that he had been hired to develop the game (his first video game project, and a crossover with Otogirisō) due to the widespread success of the first three volumes of his novel series in Japan.

Reception
Danganronpa Kirigiri was nominated for the "Best Entertainment Novel" category at the 2017 Sugoi Japan Awards, ultimately losing to Your Name. In December 2022, Game Rant lauded the series as one of the best light novel adaptations of video games, complimenting the series' "dedicated fanbase [for] releasing amazing fan translations that are well worth tracking down".

Notes

References

Japanese detective novels
Danganronpa
2013 Japanese novels
2014 Japanese novels
2015 Japanese novels
2017 Japanese novels
2018 Japanese novels
2020 Japanese novels
Light novels
Novels based on video games
Psycho (franchise)